Life After Tomorrow is a 2006 American documentary film. Executive producers Motty Reif and Chris Kelly, produced and  directed by Gil Cates Jr. and Julie Stevens, who played Tessie in the 1979 and Pepper in the 1981 Broadway productions, about the lives of the women who had once played Little Orphan Annie or one of the other orphans in the musical Annie.

On March 24, 2006, the film was premiered at the Phoenix Film Festival where it won awards for both Best Documentary and Best Director.

References

External links
 
 

2006 films
American documentary films
Documentary films about children
2006 documentary films
Films directed by Gil Cates Jr.
Documentary films about actors
Films based on Little Orphan Annie
2000s English-language films
2000s American films